Benslimane ( Arabic: بن سليمان) is a Moroccan city and the capital of Benslimane Province, Casablanca-Settat.

History 
The city was founded by the French in 1907 during the campaign of Morocco, the military establishment was followed by the construction of a residential area for military that developed along the path to Bouznika.

Located 60 km from Casablanca, the town is known for its dry climate and for hunting wild boar.

Neighbourhoods 
The city is divided into several areas such as: Bel Air District, Al Qods District, The Oaks District, Gardens District as well as other administrative and industrial areas.

References

Populated places in Benslimane Province
Benslimane
Municipalities of Morocco